Crescent Stream is a glacial meltwater stream,  long, flowing north from Crescent Glacier to the south-central shore of Lake Fryxell, in Taylor Valley, Victoria Land. It was named in association with Crescent Glacier. The name was suggested by the United States Geological Survey hydrologist Diane McKnight and was approved by the Advisory Committee on Antarctic Names and the New Zealand Geographic Board in 1994.

References 

Rivers of Victoria Land
McMurdo Dry Valleys